Moradabad (also Romanized as Morādābād) is a village in Dinaran Rural District, in the Central District of Ardal County, Chaharmahal and Bakhtiari Province, Iran. At the 2006 census, its population was 31, in 6 families. The village is populated by Lurs.

References 

Populated places in Ardal County
Luri settlements in Chaharmahal and Bakhtiari Province